was a Japanese waka poet of the mid-Heian period. His exact dates of birth and death are unknown but he flourished in the second half of the tenth century. He was one of the Thirty-six Immortals of Poetry and one of his poems was included in the Ogura Hyakunin Isshu.

He was known as an eccentric individual with numerous anecdotes told about him. He was not well regarded in his own time but later was recognized as a highly innovative poet, with roughly 90 of his poems appearing in imperial anthologies.

The following poem by him was No. 46 in Fujiwara no Teika's Ogura Hyakunin Isshu:

References

Bibliography
McMillan, Peter. 2010 (1st ed. 2008). One Hundred Poets, One Poem Each. New York: Columbia University Press.
Suzuki Hideo, Yamaguchi Shin'ichi, Yoda Yasushi. 2009 (1st ed. 1997). Genshoku: Ogura Hyakunin Isshu. Tokyo: Bun'eidō.

10th-century Japanese people
10th-century Japanese poets
Hyakunin Isshu poets